Simha is a 2010 Indian Telugu-language action drama film directed by Boyapati Srinu and produced by Paruchuri Kireeti under the United Movies banner. The film stars Nandamuri Balakrishna  in a dual role, along with Nayantara and Sneha Ullal while Rahman,  Sai Kumar, Adithya Menon, Namitha, Kota Srinivasa Rao and K. R. Vijaya play supporting roles. Music is composed by Chakri, art direction by A. S. Prakash, cinematography by Arthur Wilson and editing by Kotagiri Venkateswara Rao.

Released on 30 April 2010, the film was a blockbuster, and ended up becoming the highest-grossing Telugu film of the year. Balakrishna received his second Nandi Award for Best Actor for this film.

Plot
Srimannarayana is a university lecturer in Hyderabad who lives with his grandmother. He does not tolerate injustice anywhere and beats up people who dare to break the law, a personality which makes him feared and respected among others. A female lecturer Mahima entices him, though he doesn't reciprocate her feelings. While beating up a goon who threatened to throw acid on a girl after she spurned his advances, he accidentally punches a comatose man on the head, waking him from his 28-year coma. This man's name is Veerakesavudu.

One day, a new student Janaki joins the college where Srimannarayana is teaching. She initially thinks he is rowdy after an earlier encounter with him and seeing how everyone in the college fears him, but once she finds out about his true personality, she develops a crush on him. One day, after Srimannarayana rescues her from a group of thugs, she reveals her past. Her father, businessman Jagadish Prasad, has a business rivalry with Gopi, a gangster who happens to be Veerakesavudu's son. After Veerakesavudu woke up from his coma, he ordered Jagadish to give Janaki's hand in marriage to Gopi so their mutual rivalry is finished, to which he agreed, fearing Veerakesavudu's wrath. But Gopi killed Janaki's brother Anand Prasad during the wedding after he insulted him, prompting Jagadish to send Janaki to Hyderabad to continue her studies. The thugs who tried to kidnap her were Gopi's henchmen. On hearing this, Srimannarayana vows to protect Janaki and accommodates her next to his house. He soon reciprocates her feelings for him, prompting Maheswari to drop her love for him.

Unfortunately for Janaki, Gopi finds out she is with Srimannarayana and kidnaps her, only for Srimannarayana to rescue her after a dramatic car chase. When they reach home, they are confronted by Gopi's henchmen. Jagadish arrives there at the same time that Srimannarayana is fighting the henchmen and in a bid to help, accidentally stabs Srimannarayana's grandmother. Srimannarayana is enraged and attempts to kill him, but his grandmother stops him. Jagadish immediately leaves with Janaki. Later, Srimannarayana confronts his grandmother and asks her why she didn't let him kill Jagadish. In reply, she reveals their past.

30 years ago, in the town of Bobbili, Veerakesavudu and his family ran ruthless self-government, tormenting the townsfolk and supported by the police. The only person who dared to fight them back was a doctor named Narasimha, who belonged to the Bobbili royal family and was the father of Srimannarayana. He took the law into his own hands and killed many of Veerakesavudu's henchmen, including his brothers, when he caught them tormenting others. While not killing others, he ran a 24x7 hospital that provided treatment free of cost. His wife Gayatri was an ideal wife who was always affectionate towards Narasimha and supported all his methods. Jagadish, who was Gayatri's brother and who wanted to start a business with Veerakesavudu's help, warned her about  Narasimha's dangerous behaviour, but she brushed the warnings aside, having full faith in her husband and his methods. Veerakesavudu and his father decided to eliminate Narasimha and his family by attempting to poison them during a temple function. When the temple priest warned Narasimha about the threat to his life, Narasimha rushed to Veerakesavudu's house and killed all his men as well as his father. However, Veerakesavudu was ultimately successful in killing Narasimha and Gayatri. But just before he died, Narasimha hit Veerakesavudu on the head, sending him into a coma which he woke up from after 28 years. Narasimha's mother, who happens to be Srimannarayana's grandmother, took the young and newly orphaned Srimannarayana away with her to Hyderabad so that he could be brought up away from the violence in Bobbili.

On hearing about his family's past, Srimannarayana decides to take revenge on Veerakesavudu and heads for Bobbili to finish his father's mission. He single-handedly kills Veerakesavudu, Gopi, and their henchmen, fulfilling the wishes of the Bobbili townsfolk who wanted the Veerakesavudu family's reign of terror and horror to be ended for good.

Cast

 Nandamuri Balakrishna in a dual role as Srimannarayana, a college lecturer and Dr. Narasimha, Srimannarayana's father who single-handedly provided justice to the citizens of Bobbili
 Nayantara as Gayatri, Narasimha's wife and Srimannarayana's mother
 Sneha Ullal as Janaki, a student and Srimannarayana's love interest
 Namitha as Mahima, a colleague of Srimannarayana who is madly in love with him
 Rahman as Jagadish Prasad, a businessman, Gayatri's brother and Janaki's father
 Sai Kumar as Veerakesavudu, a gangster and the antagonist
 K. R. Vijaya as Srimannarayana's grandmother
 Adithya Menon as Gopi, a gangster and Veerakesavudu's son
 Brahmanandam as Narasimha's compounder
 Kota Srinivasa Rao as Veerakesavudu's father
 Dharmavarapu Subramanyam as Eedara Bhaskar Rao, college principal
 Chalapathi Rao as Bobbili Superintendent of Police
 Venu Madhav as Venkataratnam, the Sanskrit lecturer who is madly in love with Mahima
 Krishna Bhagavaan as Srimannarayana's servant
 Ravi Prakash as Anand Prasad, Janaki's brother
 Sravan as Veerakesavudu's brother
 Hemant Birje as Veerakesavudu's brother
 G.V. Sudhakar Naidu as Veerakesavudu's henchman
 L. B. Sriram
 Jhansi
 Madhusudhan Rao as Politician
 Fish Venkat as Politician's henchman
 Anand Ramaraju as Vicky, Politician's son
 Dhamu Dare as Software engineer

Production
Along with Boyapati, writer Koratala Siva worked on the film. In 2016, Koratala said that he asked for story and dialogue credit but Boyapati responded that he would have to choose only one of them. An angry Koratala walked away and he was credited for neither. Boyapati responded that Koratala should not have raised the issue which happened years ago.

Soundtrack

While S. Chinna composed the film score, all the songs featured in the film were composed by Chakri. Music released on ADITYA Music Company. The music was released on 31 March 2010 directly into market. The audio function of the movie was called off as Nandamuri Balakrishna met with an accident.

Reception
Upon release, the film opened to mostly positive reviews from audience as well as critics. Sify noted "Simha is out and out a formulaic movie. The urge of director Boyapati Srinu can be clearly felt in the theatre when he showed Balakrishna in an extraordinary manner." Rediff gave a two star rating saying "One knows what to expect from a Balakrishna film and Simha is a perfect example of that: a true mainstream entertainer catering to the masses with high-voltage action, overdose of violence and the mandatory songs. Balakrishna has put in a restrained performance." The Times of India stated "Balakrishna is back in his element as a fiery doctor and does a good job. Nayantara delivers a knock-out performance. While Sneha has no role to play, Namitha exudes enough oomph. Even baddies like Sai kumar, Aditya Menon and Kota Srinivas Rao put in a decent performance".

Box office
Simha collected more than  distributor share and became highest grossing Telugu film of the year. The film ran for 50 days in 338 centers and 100 days in 92 centres. The film's satellite rights were sold off at 5 crore.

Awards

References

External links
 

2010 films
2010s Telugu-language films
Films scored by Chakri
2010 masala films
Indian action drama films
Films directed by Boyapati Srinu
2010 action drama films